A Secret Life is the twelfth studio album by English singer Marianne Faithfull. It was released on 21 March 1995 by Island Records. The album marked her first studio release composed mostly of original material in over a decade. Faithfull collaborated with American composer Angelo Badalamenti after his work on the television series Twin Peaks. Influenced by her interest in classical music, A Secret Life was a musical departure from her previous work and displayed a more tender side to her voice.

Faithfull also worked with Irish poet and her longtime friend Frank McGuinness and used some of his poems in the songs "Sleep" and "The Wedding". Musically, A Secret Life is an alternative rock album which was inspired by classical music and also incorporates elements of blues. The songs deal with themes such as broken relationship on "She" or secret love affair on "Love in the Afternoon".

A Secret Life received mixed reviews from music critics. Released only months after her successful autobiography Faithfull: An Autobiography and compilation album Faithfull: A Collection of Her Best Recordings (1994), the album was a commercial failure. "Bored by Dreams" was the only single released from the album and also failed to chart.

Critical reception
A Secret Life received generally mixed reviews from music critics. Richie Unterberger at AllMusic gave it three stars out of five, claiming that "Faithfull is still in rippingly fine voice, and her words still penetrate". However, he criticized Badalamenti's orchestral arrangements and noted that "while they can be effectively noirish, they can also create an inappropriately cold and detached ambience". He described the songs  "Flaming September" and "She" as standout tracks.

Track listing

Notes

 "Prologue" contains an interpolation of Divine Comedy by Dante Alighieri.
 "Epilogue" contains an interpolation of The Tempest by William Shakespeare.

Personnel
Marianne Faithfull – vocals
Carmine D'Amico – guitar
Vinnie Bell – guitar, mandolin
Gene Orloff – violin
Alfred Brown, Julien Barber, Lamar Alsop, Ann Barak, Mitsue Takayama, Ken Fricker, Juliet Haffner, Harry Zaratzian – viola
Fred Zlotkin, Clay Ruede, Beverly Lauridsen, Julie Green – cello
Albert Regni, Pamela Sklar, Lawrence Feldman – flute, alto flute
Shelly Woodworth, Sherry Sylar – oboe, oboe d'amore
Andre Badalamenti – clarinet
Bob Carlisle – French horn
Kinny Landrum, Angelo Badalamenti – keyboards
Rufus Reid, Mark Egan, Rob Devito  - bass
Sammy Merendino, Gordon Gottlieb – drums, percussion
Technical
Gary Chester - string and woodwind recording, mixing
Art Polhemus - vocal and rhythm track recording
Tony Wright - art direction
Aldo Sampieri - design
Michel Comte, Wayne Maser - photography

References

External links
 [ A Secret Life] at AllMusic
 

1995 albums
Marianne Faithfull albums
Island Records albums
Albums produced by Angelo Badalamenti